This article lists the known discography of Buzz Feiten.

As leader

 Buzz Feiten with special guest Brandon Fields (2008), Guitar, Vocals, Songwriter
 Buzz Feiten 'Whirlies' (2000), Guitars, Bass, Synth Bass, Mandolin, Bouzouki, Percussion, Background Vocals, Songwriter (on all tracks but one)
 Buzz Feiten & The Whirlies, 'Live at the Baked Potato, Hollywood, 6-4-99' (2002), Guitar, Vocals, Producer
 Buzz Feiten, 'Buzz Feiten & the new Full Moon' (2002), Guitars, Vocals, Percussion, Songwriter, Mixer, Producer
 Full Moon, 'Full Moon' (1972, re-released in 2000), Guitar, Percussion, Vocals, Vocals (background), Songwriter, Co-Producer (on 2000 Re-Release)
 Full Moon, 'Full Moon Live' (2002), Guitar, Vocal, Engineer, Producer, Songwriter

As co-leader
 Larsen/Feiten Band, 'Larsen-Feiten Band' (1980), guitar, vocals, songwriter, horn co-arranger, co-songwriter 
 Larsen/Feiten Band, 'Full Moon featuring Neil Larsen & Buzz Feiten' (1982), guitar, vocals, horn co-arranger.

As band or group member
 DVD: 'Paul Butterfield Band' (videorecording of concert September 15, 1978, at the Grugahalle in Essen, Germany), Lead Guitar, Rhythm Guitar, Keyboard, Vocals. Includes an interview with the group, in which Buzz is credited by all with pulling the sidemen together for the concert. 'Rockpalast, the DVD Collection - Blues Rock Legends Vol 2', published by WestDeutsch Rundfunk, a division of SPV GmbH.
 The Paul Butterfield Blues Band, 'Keep on Moving' (1969), Guitar, Organ, French Horn, Background Vocals
 The Paul Butterfield Blues Band, 'An Anthology—The Elektra Years' (1997), Guitar, French Horn
 The Paul Butterfield Blues Band, 'Rockpalast: Blues Rock Legends, Vol. 2' (2010) (recording of Essen, Germany live concert September 15, 1978), Guitar
 Dave Weckl Band, 'Rhythm of the Soul' (1998), Guitar, Guitar (Rhythm) 
 Dave Weckl Band, 'Synergy' (1999), Lead & Rhythm Electric Guitar, Nylon String Guitar, Songwriter on 'A Simple Prayer' & 'Panda's Dream', Co-Songwriter on 'High Life', 'Cape Fear', 'Wet Skin', and 'Where's My Paradise?'
 Dave Weckl, 'The Zone' (2001), Lead & Rhythm Guitar—includes DVD video

As special event group member
 Various Artists, 'Casino Lights' [Recorded Live at Montreaux, Switzerland] (1982), Guitar, Co-Songwriter (with Neil Larsen) on 'Casino Lights' and 'E Minor Song'.
 Various Artists, 'Guitar Workshop in L.A.' (1988), Guitar, Co-Songwriter on 'Skunk Blues'.
 Free Creek, 'Music From Free Creek' (1973), also released as 'Summit Meeting' (1976), Guitar
 Lightnin' Rod, 'Hustlers Convention' (1973), Feiten/Larsen's Full Moon is the backing band for tracks 2, 3, 4, 5, and 8,  Kool and the Gang for tracks 1, 7, and 9

As regular featured guitarist or backup group member
 Felix Cavaliere, 'Destiny' (1975), Guitar, Electric Sitar, Horn Arranger on 'Love Came'
 Felix Cavaliere, 'Castles in the Air' (1979), Guitar
 Aretha Franklin, 'Spirit in the Dark' (1970), Guitar
 Aretha Franklin, 'Sweet Passion' (1977), Guitar
 Aretha Franklin, 'Love All the Hurt Away' (1981), Guitar
 Aretha Franklin, 'Legendary Queen of Soul' (1983), Guitar
 Aretha Franklin, 'Get It Right' (1983), Guitar
 Aretha Franklin, 'Never Grow Old' (1984), Guitar
 Aretha Franklin, 'Soul Survivor' (1986), Guitar
 Aretha Franklin, 'One Lord, One Faith, One Baptism' (1987), Guitar
 Rickie Lee Jones, 'Rickie Lee Jones' (1979), Guitar
 Rickie Lee Jones, 'Pirates' (1981), Guitar
 Rickie Lee Jones, 'Magazine' (1984), Guitar
 Rickie Lee Jones. 'Flying Cowboys' (1989), Guitar (Electric), Guitar (Classical)
 Rickie Lee Jones, 'Satellites' (CD single), 1989, Guitar (Classical)
 Rickie Lee Jones, 'Duchess Of Coolsville: An Anthology' (2005), Guitar
 Dave Koz, 'Dave Koz' (1990), Guitar
 Dave Koz, 'Lucky Man' (1993), Guitar
 Neil Larsen, 'Jungle Fever' (1978), Guitar
 Neil Larsen, 'High Gear' (1979), Guitar
 Neil Larsen, 'Through Any Window' (1987), Guitar
 Neil Larsen, 'Smooth Talk' (1989), Guitar
 Jeff Lorber, 'Private Passion' (1990), Guitar
 Jeff Lorber, 'Worth Waiting For' (1991), Guitar
 Jeff Lorber, 'Midnight' (1998), Guitar on 'Dear Prudence'
 Bette Midler, 'No Frills' (1983), Guitar
 Bette Midler, 'Experience the Divine' (Greatest Hits) (1995), Guitar
 Bette Midler, 'Bette of Roses' (1995), Guitar, Arranger, Guitar (Rhythm), Tambourine, Associate Producer
 Bette Midler, 'Experience the Divine' (1997), Guitar, Guitar (Rhythm), Associate Producer
 Randy Newman, 'Born Again' (1979), Guitar
 Randy Newman, 'Land of Dreams' (1989), Guitar
 Randy Newman, 'Guilty: 30 Years of Randy Newman' (1998), Guitar
 Olivia Newton-John, 'Live' (1983), Guitar. Video-Recording of a 1982 Utah concert which premiered on HBO.
 Art Porter, 'Pocket City' (1992), Guitar on 'Texas Hump' and 'Little People'
 Art Porter, 'Straight to the Point' (1993), Guitar
 Art Porter, 'Undercover' (1994), Guitar (Rhythm)
 Steve Postell, 'Time Still Knockin' (2011), Guitar
 The Rascals (formerly the Young Rascals), 'Peaceful World' (1971), Guitar, Bass, Vocals, Songwriter on 'Icy Water' and 'Love Letter'
 The Rascals (formerly the Young Rascals), 'Island of Real' (1972), Guitar, Arp, Vocal and Songwriter on 'Jungle Walk', Songwriter (credited as "H. Feiten") on 'Island of Real'
 The Rascals (formerly the Young Rascals), 'Anthology' (1965–1972) (1992), Guitar
 The Rascals (formerly the Young Rascals), 'The Complete Singles A's & B's' (Compilation, 2017), Guitar
 David Sanborn, 'Taking Off' (1975), Guitar, Guitar (Electric)
 David Sanborn, 'Voyeur' (1980), Guitar (Acoustic), Guitar, Guitar (Electric)
 David Sanborn, 'As We Speak' (1981), Guitar (Electric)
 David Sanborn, 'Backstreet' (1982), Guitar (Electric) on 'Backstreet'
 David Sanborn, 'The Best of David Sanborn' (1994), Electric Guitar, Acoustic Guitar
 David Sanborn, 'Original Album Series' (2010) (5-album box set—Taking Off (1975), Sanborn (1976), Heart To Heart (1978), Hideaway (1979), Voyeur (1980)), Guitar
 Tom Scott, 'Street Beat' (1979), Guitar
 Tom Scott, 'Desire' (1982), Guitar (Electric)
 Stevie Wonder, 'Music of My Mind' (1972), Guitar
 Stevie Wonder, 'Talking Book' (1972), Guitar
 Stevie Wonder, 'Songs in the Key of Life' (1976), Guitar

As studio, featured, guest, or sideman musician
 Gregg Allman, 'Laid Back' (1973), Guitar, Guitar (Electric)
 George Benson, 'George Benson Collection' (1976), Guitar
 Michel Berger, 'Dreams in Stone', Guitar
 Stephen Bishop, 'Red Cab to Manhattan' (1980), Guitar
 Doug Cameron, 'Journey to You' (1991), Guitar
 Luis Cardenas, 'Animal Instinct', Guitar
 Chicago, 'Chicago 18' (1986), Guitar
 Phil Christian,'No Prisoner', Bass, Guitar
 Gene Clark, 'No Other' (1974), Guitar
 Commander Cody & The Lost Planet Airmen, 'Flying Dreams' (1978), Guitar
 Randy Crawford, 'Windsong' (1982), Guitar
 Randy Crawford, 'Best of Randy Crawford' (1996), Guitar
 Dino, '24/7' (1989), Guitar
 Bob Dylan, 'New Morning' (1970), Guitar, Guitar (Electric)
 Bob Dylan, 'Nashville Skyline/New Morning' (1997), Guitar (Electric)
 Kiki Ebsen, 'Red', Guitar
 Michael Franks, 'Blue Pacific' (1990), Guitar (Acoustic), Guitar
 Rosie Gaines, 'Closer Than Close' (1995), Guitar
 Jon Goodwin, 'How I Wasted My Life' (2000), Guitar (Electric)
 Stefan Grossman, 'Perspective' (1979), Guitar, Guitar (Electric)
 Hall & Oates (Daryl Hall and John Oates), 'Change of Season' (1990), Guitar
 Lani Hall, 'Double or Nothing' (1979), Guitar, Background Vocals, Songwriter on 'To Know' and 'Magic Garden'
 Stuart Hamm, 'Kings of Sleep' (1989), Guitar
 Stuart Hamm, 'Urge' (1991), Guitar, Vocals
 Fareed Haque, 'Sacred Addiction' (1993), Guitar (Acoustic), Guitar, Bass (Electric), Guitar (Electric)
 Janis Ian, 'Restless Eyes' (1981), Electric Guitar
 Janis Ian, 'Uncle Wonderful' (1983), Electric Guitar
 Toshiki Kadomatsu, 'Reasons for Thousand Lovers' (1989), Guitar. Cat. #M32D-1005 (Japan) also features Jeff Lorber, Steve Gadd
 John Keane, 'Straight Away' (1999), Guitar
 Bobby King & Terry Evans, 'Rhythm, Blues, Soul & Grooves' (1990), Guitar (w/ Ry Cooder also on guitar)
 Brian Krinek, 'Flying High' (1995), Guitar
 Labelle, 'Pressure Cookin' (1973), Guitar
 Patti Labelle, 'Something Silver' (1997), Guitar
 Kenny Loggins, 'Vox Humana' (1985), Guitar
 Kenny Loggins, 'Yesterday, Today, Tomorrow: The Greatest Hits of Kenny Loggins', (1997), Guitar
 Love, 'Reel to Real' (1974), Guitar
 Sara Lovell, 'Calling' (1998), Guitar
 Melissa Manchester, 'Emergency' (1983), Guitar
 The McCrarys, 'On the Other Side', Guitar
 Murray McLauchlan, 'Murray Mclauchlan', Guitar
 Don McLean, 'Don McLean' (1972), Guitar
 Don McLean, 'Playin' Favourites' (1974), Guitar
 Larry John McNally, 'Fade to Black', Guitar
 Larry John McNally, 'Larry John McNally', Guitar (Electric)
 Gary Meek, 'Gary Meek' (1991), Guitar
 Jason Miles, 'Mr. X' (1996), Guitar
 Alec Milstein, 'Dancing in the Rain' (2000), Guitar
 Adam Mitchell, 'Redhead in Trouble' (1979), Guitar (Electric)
 Patsy Moore, 'Regarding the Human Condition' (1992), Guitar (Acoustic), Guitar (Electric)
 Mr. Mister, 'Pull' (1990), Guitar
 Mr. Mister, 'The Best of Mr. Mister' (2001), Guitar
 Alannah Myles, 'Rockinghorse' (1992), Guitar
 Jerry Novac, 'Novac / The Fifth Word' (1970), Guitar, credited as "Buzzy Feitan"
 Claus Ogerman (with Michael Brecker), 'Cityscape' (1982), Guitar
 Stu Nunnery, 'Stu Nunnery' (1973), Bass, Guitar
 Michael Paulo, 'Fusebox' (1990), Guitar
 Bill Quateman, 'Just Like You' (1979), Guitar, Guitar (Electric), Guitar (Rhythm), Vocals (background). Also on guitar: Jeff Baxter.
 Brenda Russell, 'Love Life' (1981), Guitar
 Evie Sands, 'Suspended Animation' (1979), Guitar (Electric)
 Boz Scaggs, 'Other Roads' (1988), Guitar
 Ben Sidran, 'Cat and the Hat' (1977), 'Guitar'
 Edwin Starr, 'Stronger Than You Think I Am' (1980), Guitar
 Curtis Stigers, 'Curtis Stigers' (1991), Guitar
 Syreeta, 'Syreeta' (1972), Guitar
 Livingston Taylor, 'Over the Rainbow' (1973), Guitar
 Livingston Taylor, 'Carolina Day: The Collection' (1998), Guitar
 Tanya Tucker, 'Should I Do It' (1981), Guitar
 Dwight Twilley, 'Jungle' (1984), Guitar
 Jennifer Warnes, 'Shot through the Heart' (1979), Guitar
 David Waters, 'Island Refugee' (1995), Guitar
 Tim Weisberg, 'Best of Tim Weisberg: Smile!' (1979), Guitar
 Tim Weisberg, 'Party of One' (1980), Guitar
 Gary Wright, 'Headin' Home' (1979), Acoustic Guitar
 Jesse Colin Young, 'Perfect Stranger' (1982), Guitar

In anthologies or samplers
 Various Artists, 'JVC World Class Sampler, Vol. 2' (1989), Guitar
 Various Artists, 'Rock of the 70's, Vol. 4' (1992), Guitar
 Various Artists, 'Best of Smooth Jazz, Vol. 3' (1998), Guitar
 Various Artists, 'Midnight Groove: Art of Smooth Jazz' (1998), Guitar
 Various Artists, 'The LA Cowboys: Endless Summer' (1993), Guitar on 'Something In My Heart' (credited as "Buzz 'Stoney' Feiten")

In film, television, or video Soundtracks
 Michael Kamen, 'Hudson Hawk' (film), original score
 Film 'Footloose' [Original Soundtrack] (1984), Guitar
 Original TV Soundtrack, 'Melrose Place Jazz: Upstairs at MP' (1998), Guitar

References 
 Buzz Feiten credits
 Buzzy Feiten discography

Feiten, Buzz